The Women's FIH Pro League is an international women's field hockey competition organised by the International Hockey Federation (FIH), which replaces the Women's FIH Hockey World League. The competition also serves as a qualifier for the Hockey World Cup and the Olympic Games.

The first edition was started in 2019. Nine teams secured their places for four years.

Format

Nine teams will compete in a round-robin tournament with home and away matches, played from January to June, with the top four teams advancing to the grand final at a pre-determined location. In July 2017, Hockey India decided to withdraw both the men's and women's national teams from the competition as they estimated the chances of qualifying for the Summer Olympics to be higher when participating in the Hockey Series. Hockey India also cited lack of clarity in the ranking system. The International Hockey Federation subsequently invited Belgium instead.

On 17 September 2021, both, New Zealand and Australia, withdrew from the 2021–22 season due to the COVID-19 pandemic and the travel restrictions coming with it. They were replaced by India and Spain on 8 October 2021.

Current teams

 as part of 

Former teams

  (competed in the 2021-22 season)
  (competed in the 2021-22 season)

2020 format changes
For the 2020 edition, the home and away principle is kept but this principle will now be split over two consecutive seasons and work according to the following example:
in 2020, Team A will host Team B twice within a couple of days
in 2021, Team B will host Team A twice within a couple of days
Also this new format removes the grand final event, held in the previous edition.

2022 format changes
From 2022 onwards the bottom team at the end of the season will be relegated and will be replaced by the winner of a new competition called the Women's FIH Hockey Nations Cup.

The home and away principle will be kept, however the season will be divided into date blocks. To assist with competition planning, international and national, several teams will gather in on venue to contest “mini-tournaments," wherein they each play two matches against one another.

Results

2019

2020–present

Summary

* = Grand Final hosts

Team appearances

See also
Men's FIH Pro League
FIH Hockey Series
Women's FIH Hockey Nations Cup
Women's FIH Hockey World League

References

 
FIH Pro League
FIH Pro League Women